is a motorcycle racing arcade video game released by Sega as the sequel to Hang-On. It uses a simulated motorcycle arcade cabinet, like the original game. An updated  version was released in arcades 1991 as Limited Edition Hang-On.

Gameplay

The arcade mode in Super Hang-On is similar to the original Hang-On. However, there is a choice of four tracks to race on which are based on continents, each containing a different number of stages. Also, should the player reach the normal maximum speed of 280 km/h, a turbo button is enabled. Using this button allows the player to reach an even higher top speed of 324 km/h. Each stage is roughly half the length of a stage in the original Hang-On. Africa is the easiest and shortest out of the four courses (six stages). Asia is the second easiest and is similar in length to the course from the original Hang-On at ten stages long. The Americas is the second to toughest course, containing 14 stages and Europe is the hardest course, being 18 stages long. When the player starts a race, they have their choice of four songs that will play during the race, a feature borrowed from Out Run.

The Sega Mega Drive version of the game included the full arcade game, and an additional original mode, which allowed players to recruit sponsors and earn money to buy enhanced components for their bike. The cover for this version has a bike and rider in the same colors as Shinichi Itoh, who competed in the All-Japan 500 cc Championship on a Rothmans Honda NSR500.

Ports
Versions of the game were released for the ZX Spectrum, Amstrad CPC and Commodore 64 in 1987 with further home conversions following for the Mega Drive/Genesis, Amiga, Atari ST, Macintosh, X68000, and MS-DOS in 1989 and 1990. The game also appeared on several Mega Drive compilations, namely Mega Games I (bundled with the console as Mega Drive Magnum Set), and Sega 6-Pak.

It was included in Sega Arcade Gallery for Game Boy Advance.

The arcade version was released on the Wii's Virtual Console service in Japan on September 14, 2010, and later in North America and Europe on May 3, 2012. Like Shinobi and its omission of any references to Marilyn Monroe, the Virtual Console version of Super Hang-On was slightly altered to avoid any copyright troubles. This includes the replacing of several in-game billboards which used to feature real brand names such as Cibie with similar billboards which mention other Sega games such as OutRun and After Burner. This version would be released on Xbox Live Arcade in 2012 as part of Sega Vintage Collection: Alex Kidd & Co.

Another version of the game was released for the Nintendo 3DS via the Nintendo eShop in Japan on March 27, 2013. The game feature stereoscopic 3D and tilt controls which emulate the arcade version. This version was released for North America and Europe on November 28.

Super Hang-On is playable at the in-game arcades in Yakuza 0, Yakuza 6, and Fist of the North Star: Lost Paradise.

Reception 

In Japan, Game Machine listed Super Hang-On on their June 1, 1987 issue as being the most-successful upright arcade unit of the month. The ride-on cabinet went on to become Japan's second highest-grossing upright/cockpit arcade game of 1987, below Out Run. It was later Japan's seventh highest-grossing arcade game of 1988.

Peter Shaw of Your Sinclair reviewed the arcade game, calling it "brilliant, fast and the most accurate simulation of riding a motorbike I've ever played". Mega Action reviewed the Mega Drive version saying Super Hang On is one of the best driving games for the Mega Drive, they concluded with a review score of 89%.

The ZX Spectrum version scored 10/10 in Sinclair User and awarded it the "SU Classic" accolade. It was rated number 27 in the Your Sinclair Official Top 100 Games of All Time.

See also
Hang-On GP

Notes

References

External links

1987 video games
Amiga games
Amstrad CPC games
Arcade video games
Atari ST games
Commodore 64 games
Game Boy Advance games
Classic Mac OS games
Motorcycle video games
Nintendo 3DS eShop games
PlayStation Network games
Racing video games
Sega-AM2 games
Sega arcade games
Sega Genesis games
X68000 games
Wii Wheel games
Xbox 360 Live Arcade games
ZX Spectrum games
Video games designed by Yu Suzuki
Video games developed in Japan
Virtual Console games for Wii